The FC Basel 1944–45 season was the fifty-second season since the club's foundation on 15 November 1893. FC Basel played their home games in the Landhof in the district Wettstein in Kleinbasel. Emil Junker was the club's new chairman. He took over from Albert Besse following the AGM on 8 July 1944.

Overview 
Max Barras was appointed as new first team manager. Basel played 43 games in their 1944–45 season. 28 in the Nationalliga (including two replayed games), three in the Swiss Cup and 12 were test games. They won 14, drew 10 and lost 19 times. In total, including the test games and the cup competition, they scored 86 goals and conceded 82. René Bader was the best scorer with 14 goals, Willy Monigatti second best with 13.

There were 14 teams contesting in the 1944–45 Nationalliga A. The two teams that finished in last and second last position in the league table would be relegated. Basel played a bad season, winning just six matches, drawing six and they suffered 14 defeats, thus they ended the season with 18 points in 13th position, second last. Two of the games during the season were played under protest and were later replayed. These were the games on 24 September 1944 against Lugano and on 29 April 1945 against Grenchen. The protest was because Basel could not field their best teams due to the military duties of their players. Both replayed games ended with a defeat. Grasshopper Club won the Swiss championship, Basel and St. Gallen were relegated. René Bader was the best league goal scorer with 11 goals and Willy Monigatti second best with 9 league goals.

In the Swiss Cup Basel started in the 3rd principal round with an away tie against lower tier local side FC Allschwil and a 6–0 victory. In the round of 32 Basel had a home game at the Landhof against lower tier SC Zofingen which ended with a 3–1 win. In the round of 16 Basel travelled to an away game against St. Gallen and were knocked out of the competition.

Players 

 
 
 

 

 
 
 

 

  

 

Players who left the squad

Results

Legend

Friendly matches

Pre- and mid-season

Winter break to end of season

Nationalliga

League matches 

Notes

League matches Replays

League table

Swiss Cup

See also 
 History of FC Basel
 List of FC Basel players
 List of FC Basel seasons

References

Sources 
 Rotblau: Jahrbuch Saison 2014/2015. Publisher: FC Basel Marketing AG. 
 Die ersten 125 Jahre. Publisher: Josef Zindel im Friedrich Reinhardt Verlag, Basel. 
 FCB team 1944–45 at fcb-archiv.ch
 Switzerland 1944–45 by Erik Garin at Rec.Sport.Soccer Statistics Foundation

External links
 FC Basel official site

FC Basel seasons
Basel